The Final Warning is the fourth novel in the Maximum Ride series by James Patterson. It was released in the US and in the UK on March 17, 2008.

References 

Maximum Ride
2008 American novels